Gum Creek may refer to:

Gum Creek (Missouri), a stream in Missouri
Gum Creek (Virginia), a historic house near Columbia, Virginia